Esher was a borough constituency represented in the House of Commons of the Parliament of the United Kingdom. It elected one Member of Parliament (MP) by the first past the post system of election.  In the general elections during its 47-year lifetime it was won by three Conservatives successively.  In area it shrank in 1974, then regrew in 1983 taking in four sparsely inhabited wards which proved to be temporary, as omitted from the successor seat, Esher and Walton.

Boundaries
1950–1974: Urban Districts of Esher, and Walton and Weybridge.

1974–1983: The Urban District of Esher.

Walton, Hersham, Weybridge and Oatlands were transferred to the new Chertsey and Walton seat.

1983–1997: 
The Borough of Guildford wards: Clandon and Horsley, Effingham, Lovelace (included Ockham), and Send (for this period temporarily taken from the Mole Valley seat); and 
Borough of Elmbridge wards: Claygate, Cobham and Downside, Cobham Fairmile, Esher, Hinchley Wood, Long Ditton, Molesey East, Molesey North, Molesey South, Oxshott and Stoke D'Abernon, Thames Ditton, and Weston Green (its whole area except for Walton, Hersham, Weybridge and Oatlands). These 13 wards were equivalent to Esher Urban District.

Neighbours
Dorking
Guildford
Chertsey
Surbiton

or their variations including:
Chertsey and Walton
Mole Valley
Kingston and Surbiton

Members of Parliament

Elections

Elections in the 1950s

Elections in the 1960s

Elections in the 1970s

Elections in the 1980s

Elections in the 1990s

See also
List of parliamentary constituencies in Surrey

Notes and references
Notes 
  
References

Sources
Election results, 1983 - 1992  (Election Demon,)
Election results, 1951 - 1992  (Keele University)

Parliamentary constituencies in South East England (historic)
Constituencies of the Parliament of the United Kingdom established in 1950
Constituencies of the Parliament of the United Kingdom disestablished in 1997
Borough of Elmbridge
Politics of Surrey

ar:إيشر ووالتن (دائرة انتخابية في المملكة المتحدة)